Delshire is a census-designated place (CDP) in Delhi Township, Hamilton County, Ohio, United States. The population was 3,158 at the 2020 census.

Geography

Education
Delshire is home to Delshire Elementary School, which is a part of the Oak Hills Local School District. Delshire is also home to St. Dominic Catholic School.

References

Census-designated places in Hamilton County, Ohio
Census-designated places in Ohio